Guillaume Cyr (born February 27, 1982) is a Canadian actor from Quebec. He is most noted for his performance as Horace Barré in the 2013 film Louis Cyr (Louis Cyr, l'homme le plus fort du monde), for which he won the Jutra Award for Best Supporting Actor at the 16th Jutra Awards in 2014.

He has been a nominee in the same category on two other occasions, at the 19th Quebec Cinema Awards for The New Life of Paul Sneijder (La nouvelle vie de Paul Sneijder) and at the 24th Quebec Cinema Awards in 2022 for The Time Thief (L'Arracheuse de temps).

Originally from Sainte-Marie, Quebec, he is a graduate of the National Theatre School of Canada.

His other roles have included the films Babine, Wetlands (Marécages), Laurentia (Laurentie), Small Blind (La mise à l'aveugle), Miraculum, The Decline (Jusqu'au déclin) and Family Game (Arsenault et fils), and the television series Le berceau des anges, Fatale-Station, Les Beaux malaises, GAME(R), Epidemic, Léo and La Confrèrie.

References

External links

1982 births
Living people
21st-century Canadian male actors
Canadian male film actors
Canadian male stage actors
Canadian male television actors
French Quebecers
Male actors from Quebec
National Theatre School of Canada alumni
People from Sainte-Marie, Quebec
Best Supporting Actor Jutra and Iris Award winners